Pisonia sechellarum is a species of flowering plant in the family Nyctaginaceae. It is indigenous to the Seychelles and the Comoros archipelago. In Seychelles, it is limited to Silhouette Island, where it is the dominant tree but has a total population of about 190 individuals.

References

Further reading
Gerlach, J., Senterre, B., & Barthelat, F. (2013). A review of the conservation status of the threatened western Indian Ocean island tree Pisonia sechellarum (Nyctaginaceae). Journal of Threatened Taxa 5(12), 4621–4629.

sechellarum
Trees of Seychelles
Endangered plants
Endemic flora of Seychelles
Taxonomy articles created by Polbot